James Barr is British Radio DJ, TV presenter, podcaster and comedian, best known for his award winning podcast, A Gay and a Non-Gay with Dan Hudson. Barr is an openly gay man and advocate for the LGBT+ community and mental health, as well as a number of other issues. He has toured the UK with his comedy tour 'Thirst Trap', as well as presented on MTV, and also hosts The Breakfast Show on Hits Radio with the X Factor series 11 runner-up Fleur East, and radio host Matt Haslam. Barr has also written columns for Attitude magazine, as well as covered conversion therapy for the BBC, and hosted live coverage from the Isle of Wight Festival, Brighton Pride and Manchester Pride. He is a patron of several LGBT+ charities, including Student Pride; and has advocated for the use of pronouns earning him praise from the non-binary British singer-songwriter Sam Smith.

Career

Early work as a presenter 
In 2017, Barr obtained notoriety for his role as a presenter on MTV News. That same year, Barr also hosted the 2017 Student Pride Festival in London, alongside his role as a presenter on Heat Radio. Across his roles as a presenter on MTV, ambassador for Student Pride, A Gay and a NonGay podcast, and columnist for Attitude magazine, Barr has interviewed celebrities including Ariana Grande, Justin Bieber, Taylor Lautner, Chloe Grace Moretz, Troye Sivan, DNCE and Charli XCX, amongst others. His other ventures included live presenting at the Isle of Wight Festival, Brighton Pride and Manchester Pride, as well as presenting as a red-carpet reporter at the BRIT Awards. He has also appeared as a panellist on Eurovision: You Decide and BBC Three docu-series I'm Coming Out. Barr and Kristen Meinzer briefly hosted a podcast called When Megan Met Harry: A Royal Wedding Cast, a play on words of the Nora Ephron-romcom film When Harry Met Sally... (1989), and covers the royal engagement and wedding of Prince Harry, Duke of Sussex and Meghan Markle.

A Gay and a NonGay 
Barr's podcast A Gay and a NonGay has been called the "UK's leading LGBTQ+ comedy podcast" by the media. Barr initially began the podcast in 2016, after his friend Talia moved abroad and asked him to look after her boyfriend Dan Hudson. The podcast centres around topical discussion from gay and non-gay perspectives, with James providing the gay perspective, and Dan Hudson providing the heterosexual perspective. The podcast "challenges their differences to show that gays and nongays can be the best of friends. They cover a range of topics from day to day life, differences in perceptions, homophobia, coming out, mental health and lighter topics like dating and Dan learning all about douching." According to Pods up North, the podcast has over two million listens as of 2020. The duo were due to take the show out on tour in 2020, but this was cancelled due to the COVID-19 pandemic. A Gay and a NonGay was nominated for the Best Entertainment Podcast in 2017 and won the Bronze Award for the 2018 Best Comedy Category at the British Podcast Awards. Since then, Barr has been part of the judging panel for the awards.

Comedy show Thirst Trap 
In early 2019, Barr played a series of comedy shows at the Above the Stag Theatre, in Vauxhall, London. Titled Thirst Trap, the show covers Barr's "disastrous dating life" and explores his relationship with social media. It was met with critical acclaim, particularly for its audience interaction as he "invites audience members to join him for impromptu speed dates as he recalls the thrills and spills of his romantic past". Following its initial success in London, Barr took the show to the 2019 Edinburgh Fringe Festival, playing 24 shows from 1–25 August (except for the 12th). After his appearance at the Edinburg Fringe, it was reported that Barr would be working with STV Entertainment to develop Thirst Trap as a format.

Hits Radio Breakfast Show 
In June 2019, it was announced that Barr would be joining the X Factor series 11 runner-up Fleur East, and radio host Greg Burns as the new hosts of the Hits Radio Breakfast Show, launching on 12 July 2019. The show is aimed at audiences aged 25–44. Six weeks after launch, it was announced that Barr, Burns and East would be taking the Saturday morning breakfast show; Saturday mornings with Fleur East, Greg and James features highlights from the weekday Hits Radio Breakfast Show.

Personal life 
During an interview with Celeb Mix Barr spoke openly about his coming out experience, noting that he experienced a negative reception with his parents. He said "At first, my mum said her son isn’t her son anymore. She felt that it was her fault. My dad thought this would just be a phase. It's all turned around, me and my mum could not be any closer now. She supports me with everything. My sister is a Christian. I sent her an email full of bible quotes to come out to her so she could read them in a different way and see this is fine."

Philanthropy 
Barr is an ambassador and advocate for LGBT+ charities, including Student Pride. In 2019, Barr and Hudson covered conversion therapy for a three-part BBC Radio 1 series. Barr is also a supporter of gender rights and freedom of sexual expression; he gained praise from British singer-songwriter Sam Smith after Smith came out as non-binary, Smith praised Barr for using Smith's chosen pronouns.

Awards and nominations

See also 
Hits Radio
MTV News

Notes

References

External links 
A Gay or Nongay official website
James Barr official website

Living people
English radio DJs
English radio presenters
English television personalities
English television presenters
English male comedians
English stand-up comedians
Gay feminists
Gay comedians
English LGBT comedians
English LGBT broadcasters
English LGBT rights activists
English gay writers
LGBT DJs
MTV News
Radio presenters from London
Year of birth missing (living people)